The Congo Volcano, in Spanish the  and also known as Congo Mountain, is an inactive volcano in Costa Rica, situated in the Cordillera Central range near the Poás Volcano and within the Poás Volcano National Park.

Toponymy 

 The name comes from the Mantled howler monkey, locally known as Congo monkey, as it is common to find it in the region and its howling can be hear at great distances. The name was in use by the 19th century.

Physical aspects 

The Congo volcano is a stratovolcano, with an area of 25 km2, 6 km north of Poás Volcano. The crater is open on its north side, and it is very eroded due to rain, which in turn provides the source for María Aguilar river and its valley.

References 

Stratovolcanoes of Costa Rica
Mountains of Costa Rica
Inactive volcanoes